Ernst Kornemann (11 October 1868, Rosenthal near Kassel – 4 December 1946, Munich) was a German classical historian.

Biography 
He studied at Giessen (1878–89) and Berlin (1889–92), and took the degree of doctor of philosophy (1891); he was appointed assistant professor teaching under the faculty (1892). He became privatdocent of ancient history at Giessen (1892) and then professor at Tübingen (1902). With Dr. Lehmann-Haupt, of Liverpool, he established the periodical Klio, dedicated to ancient history.

Literary works 
His publications include:
1891 De civibus Romanis in provinciis imperii consistentibus.
1896 Die historische Schriftstellerei des Consuls Asinius Pollio.
1903 Zur Geschichte der Graechenzeit.
1904 Die neue Livius-Epitome aus Oxyrhynchus.
1905 Kaiser Hadrian und der letzte grosse Historiker von Rom.
1912 Priesterkodex in der Regia und die Entstehung der altrömische Pseudogeschichte.
1921 Mausoleum und Tatenbericht des Augustus, Leizpg: Teubner.
1923 Einleitung in die Altertumswissenschaft (edited by Alfred Gercke and Eduard Norden; Bd. 3, Halbband 2).
1926 Vom antiken Staat, Berlin: Ferdinand Hirt.
1927 Die Stellung der Frau in der vorgriechischen Mittelmeerkultur, Heidelberg: C. Winter.
1929 Staat und Wirtschaft, Breslau: M.& H. Marcus.
1929 Neue Dokumente zum lakonischen Kaiserkult, Breslau: M.& H. Marcus.
1930 Doppelprinzipat und Reichsteilung im Imperium Romanum, Leipzig: Teubner.
1934 Staaten, Völker, Männer, Leipzig: Dieterich.
1934 Die unsichtbaren Grenzen des Römischen Kaiserreiches, Budapest: Ungarische Akademie der Wissenschaften.
1937 Augustus, Breslau: Priebatsch's Buchhandlung.
1941 Das Imperium Romanum, Breslau: Korn.
1942 Große Frauen des Altertums, Leipzig: Dieterich.
1943 Gestalten und Reiche, Leipzig: Dieterich.
1946 Tacitus, Wiesbaden: Dieterich.
1947 Das Prinzipat des Tiberius und der "Genius Senatus", München: Verlag der Bayerischen Akademie des Wissenschaften.
1949 Weltgeschichte des Mittelmeerraumes. Von Philipp II. von Makedonien bis Muhammed, edition of Hermann Bengtson (Teilabdruck 1978: Geschichte der Spätantike).

Notes

References

External links 

19th-century German historians
20th-century German historians
People from Waldeck-Frankenberg
1868 births
1946 deaths
University of Giessen alumni
Humboldt University of Berlin alumni
Academic staff of the University of Tübingen
German male non-fiction writers